Wendell Lady (December 12, 1930 – September 22, 2022) was an American politician who served in the Kansas House of Representatives from 1969 to 1983. He served as Speaker of the Kansas House of Representatives from 1979 to 1983.

Lady died on September 22, 2022, at the age of 91.

References

1930 births
2022 deaths
Speakers of the Kansas House of Representatives
Republican Party members of the Kansas House of Representatives
20th-century American politicians
People from Dickinson County, Kansas